Deh Now-ye Kizavak (also Romanized as Deh Now-ye Kīzavak) is a village in Donbaleh Rud-e Jonubi Rural District, Dehdez District, Izeh County, Khuzestan Province, Iran. At the 2006 census, its population was 387, in 75 families.

References 

Populated places in Izeh County